Charles Henry Burns (January 19, 1835 – May 22, 1909) was an American attorney and politician who served in the New Hampshire Senate and as the United States Attorney for the District of New Hampshire.

Early life
Burns was born in Milford, Massachusetts to Charles A., and Elizabeth (Hutchinson) Burns on January 19, 1835 he spent his early life on his fathers farm.  From the age of seventeen, to when he was twenty one, Burns taught school in Ashby, Massachusetts, New Ipswich, New Hampshire and Lyndeborough, New Hampshire.

Early legal career
Burns graduated from Harvard Law School in 1858, in May 1858 he was admitted to the Massachusetts Bar at Suffolk County, Massachusetts.  Early in 1859, Burns was admitted to the New Hampshire Bar,  and in January 1859 he began practicing law in Wilton, New Hampshire.

Family life
Burns married Sarah N. Mills on January 19, 1856, they had eight children.

Public service

County Solicitor
In 1864 and 1865, Burns was appointed as the County Treasurer of Hillsborough County, New Hampshire.

County Treasurer
In 1876, Burns was appointed as the County Solicitor of Hillsborough County, New Hampshire.  Burns was subsequently elected twice to this position after the state constitution was changed to make this an elective office.

New Hampshire Senate
Burns was a member of the New Hampshire Senate in 1873 and in 1879. Burns was the Charmain of the Judiciary Committee during both of his terms in the Senate.

US Attorney
In February 1881, Burns was appointed the United States Attorney for the District of New Hampshire.  Burns was reappointed in February 1881, he served as United States Attorney for six years. because he resigned in his second term.

Death
Burns died at Wilton, New Hampshire on May 22, 1909.

References

1835 births
1909 deaths
People from Milford, Massachusetts
United States Attorneys for the District of New Hampshire
Republican Party New Hampshire state senators
New Hampshire lawyers
Harvard Law School alumni
19th-century American politicians